This article is about the particular significance of the year 2000 to Wales and its people.

Incumbents

First Secretary (until 16 October)/First Minister
Alun Michael (until 9 February)
Rhodri Morgan
Secretary of State for Wales – Paul Murphy
Archbishop of Wales – Rowan Williams, Bishop of Monmouth
Archdruid of the National Eisteddfod of Wales – Meirion Evans

Events
 3 February – At the Ceredigion by-election, Simon Thomas holds the seat for Plaid Cymru.
15 February – North Wales child abuse scandal: Sir Ronald Waterhouse publishes the report of his inquiry into abuse in children's homes in north Wales.
24 May – National Botanic Garden of Wales opens near Llanarthney in the Towy Valley, Carmarthenshire (official opening by the Prince of Wales: 21 July).
August 
The National Eisteddfod of Wales is held at Llanelli.
Donald Wales sets a UK electric land speed record of 220 km/h at Pendine Sands in Bluebird Electric 2.
15 October – Dedication of the new organ at St David's Cathedral.
16 October – Rhodri Morgan's official title as leader of the Welsh Assembly is changed from First Secretary to First Minister. The post of Deputy First Minister for Wales is simultaneously created, and Mike German is appointed.
18 November – Catherine Zeta-Jones marries Michael Douglas at the Plaza Hotel, New York City.
14 December – Penderyn whisky begins production.
The Cardiff Bay Development Corporation is wound up, having achieved its main objective of regenerating the former docklands of Cardiff.
The Royal Glamorgan Hospital opens at Ynysmaerdy, Talbot Green, near Llantrisant in Rhondda Cynon Taf, to replace East Glamorgan General Hospital.

Arts and literature
Siân Phillips is appointed a CBE in the Queen's birthday honours list.
Bryn Terfel's Faenol Festival is launched.
The Welsh Music Foundation is established.
Between May and August, over 100 rare maps are stolen from the National Library of Wales.  A man later confesses to having stolen and sold them to collectors.

Awards
Glyndŵr Award – Robin Huw Bowen
National Eisteddfod of Wales: Chair – Llion Jones
National Eisteddfod of Wales: Crown – Dylan Iorwerth
National Eisteddfod of Wales: Prose Medal – Eurig Wyn, Tri Mochyn Bach
Wales Book of the Year:
English language: Sheenagh Pugh – Stonelight
Welsh language: Gwyneth Lewis – Y Llofrudd Iaith
Gwobr Goffa Daniel Owen – Geraint V. Jones, Cur y Nos

New books
Trezza Azzopardi – The Hiding Place
Ruth Bidgood – Singing to Wolves
Jon Gower – Big Fish
Jerry Hunter – Soffestri’r Saeson
Martin Johnes & Iain McLean – Aberfan: Government and Disasters
Sheenagh Pugh – Stonelight
Lorna Sage – Bad Blood
Owen Sheers – The Blue Book

Music
Richard Churches – Requiem Mass
Larry Goves – walking underground
Racing Cars – A Bolt from the Blue
Super Furry Animals – Mwng

Film

English-language films
One of the Hollywood Ten, written and directed by Karl Francis
The Testimony of Taliesin Jones with Jonathan Pryce and Matthew Rhys
Rancid Aluminium, based on the novel by James Hawes, with Rhys Ifans, Keith Allen and Brian Hibbard.
102 Dalmatians, with Ioan Gruffudd and his future wife Alice Evans

Welsh-language films
Moth (S4C)

Broadcasting

English-language television
Rob Brydon stars in Marion and Geoff

Welsh-language television
Cân i Gymru 2000
Porc Peis Bach
Hacio

Sport
BBC Wales Sports Personality of the Year – Tanni Grey-Thompson
Golf
Celtic Manor Wales Open: European Tour tournament first played.
Phillip Price is ranked 8th in the world.
Snooker
13 February – Matthew Stevens wins the Masters.
1 May – Mark Williams wins the World Snooker Championship for the first time, defeating Matthew Stevens in an all-Welsh final.

Births
8 August – Dylan Michael Douglas, son of Michael Douglas and Catherine Zeta-Jones

Deaths
19 January – Rex Willis, Wales international rugby union player, 75
19 February – Josef Herman, artist, 88
23 February – John Nevill, 5th Marquess of Abergavenny, 85
11 March – Will Roberts, painter, 92
7 April – Walter Vickery, Wales international rugby player, 90
12 April – Ronald Lockley, naturalist, 96
20 May – David Pearce, boxer, 41
28 May – Donald Davies, computer scientist and inventor, 75
30 May – Doris Hare, actress, 95
10 July – Dilwyn Lewis, designer, 76
19 July – Philip Jones, civil servant, 69
26 July – Albert Fear, Wales international rugby player, 92
17 September – Paula Yates, television presenter (born in Colwyn Bay), 41 (suicide)
25 September – R. S. Thomas, poet, 87
30 September – Howard Winstone, boxing champion, 61
11 November – Sir Alun Talfan Davies, judge, 87
December – George Evans, footballer, 65
2 December – Rosemarie Frankland, former Miss World, 57 (drug overdose)
22 December – Harry Payne, Wales international rugby player, 93
date unknown – Doug Rees, footballer

See also
2000 in England
2000 in Northern Ireland
2000 in Scotland

References

 
Wales